Rubik's Games is a, five games in one, PC game created for Windows 95/98 developed in part by Ernő Rubik
 with Androsoft and was published by Hasbro Interactive. It was part of Hasbro's classical games collection of PC related games, translating their most famous board games into best possible quality video games. A history of the Rubik's Cube and its inventor, written out in a webpage type file, with pictures is available from the Menu.

The games
All games have a Challenge and free play mode.

Rubik's Classics The main puzzle 3x3 was composed of a standard Rubik's Cube, where the player could play and solve the puzzle using the PC's mouse, and even a paint and solve feature where they could paint the sides of the cube and then click on the solve feature, the computer would find the quickest solution to that arrangement of the puzzle. This could help the player solve a standard cube that they had at home without having to peel off the stickers or without taking their Cube apart so they can have a solved cube to play with. The Classics section also had the 2x2, 2x3, 4x4 and 5x5 versions of the puzzle.

Cover Up
On a grid of various sizes a series of colored columns are stacked up and the players job is to lay all the tiles so they completely cover the grid. As the grids become larger the stacks also become larger and more difficult to figure out in which patterns the tiles will fit onto the grid. The grid board can be turned at different angles to better see the grid.

Zigthrough
A chain of five squares, like a snake, can be moved left and right while it comes down from the top of the screen. As the chain moves the colors of the chain can be moved forward as desired so the head of the chain can be any of the five colors. As the chain reaches another block set on the playing field it stops, and the only way to clear the colored blocks off the playing field is to connect three squares of the same color. There are also irremovable blocks, that act as a barrier to get around. Once the path is clear the chain can reach the goal.

Rubik's Playground
Working more as an experiment in Physics, the player guides a series of balls down ramps and across other hazards to reach the exit. There are four different types of balls: iron, rubber, plastic and exploding. The player can bump the balls into each other, or speed them up using ramps and magnets. A required number of balls entering the Exit are needed to complete each puzzle. The player can create and save their own Playground puzzles, and save them into files on their computer, which can be uploaded to the Game's Official webpage.

Paint War
Is a Chess type game where the player has pieces that rank from zero to five and only pieces with a smaller number can take the pieces of their opponent, the zero piece can be taken by another zero piece that strikes first or a number 5. Like the pawns in Chess being promoted the zero piece can be promoted to a number 5 if the players #5 piece has been taken out of the game. There are two ways to complete each match against the computer, or over the internet using the games webpage link.
1. Paint more of the 42 squares before the computer does.
2. Take all the computers players this is known as a KO.
The number of the piece determines the number of squares that piece can paint. The player's opponent can paint a square and the player can paint over it, yet the match ends when all the squares have been painted or all the opponents pieces have been taken.

Challenge and weblink
Rubik's Challenges consist of 100 challenges spread out between all five of the games. Once players have managed to complete all the Challenges they are given the option to upload their names onto the 'Eternal Rubik's Master' list on  the game's official site. Completing all these challenges is only the beginning and only a small portion of the game is required to be beaten to get this ranking. The game allowed players to save their high scores and best times and even upload them to the game's website. Playability was also increased by players being able to create their own puzzles in the Rubik's Playground and upload them to the website or email them to other players.

See also
 Rubik's Puzzle World
 Atari Video Cube

References
 Walk through and Solutions of all 'Rubik's Games' puzzles, by "Teary Eyes" Anderson at IGN.com

External links
 Official Rubik's webpage

Rubik's Cube
Video games developed in Hungary
Windows games
Windows-only games
Puzzle video games
1999 video games
Video games about toys
Video games based on toys